The Tri-R KIS TR-1 is an American homebuilt aircraft that was designed by Rich Trickel and produced by Tri-R Technologies of Oxnard, California, introduced in the 1990s. When it was available the aircraft was supplied as a kit for amateur construction.

Design and development
Trickel's main business was High Tech Composites, a company that produced many airframe components under sub-contract for kit aircraft such as the Lancair 235, Lancair 320 and Lancair IV. Trickel originally drew a new aircraft as a set of three-views for a customer in Australia who was looking for a new, conventional aircraft concept. The customer liked the design, but never paid for the drawings, so Trickel brought them home and completed the design work himself. Eventually the new design became the KIS TR-1.

The KIS TR-1 features a cantilever low-wing, a two-seats-in-side-by-side configuration enclosed cockpit accessed via gull-wing doors, fixed tricycle landing gear or optionally conventional landing gear with wheel pants and a single engine in tractor configuration.

The aircraft is made from composites.

The manufacturer estimated the construction time from the supplied kit as 1000 hours.

Variants

KIS TR-1
By 1998 the company reported that 25 aircraft were completed and flying. In March 2014 ten examples were registered in the United States with the Federal Aviation Administration, although a total of 13 had been registered at one time. Also in March 2014 there were seven registered in the United Kingdom with the CAA.

KIS TR-1/TD
By 1998 the company reported that eight aircraft were completed and flying.

Specifications (KIS TR-1)

References

External links

KIS TR-1
1990s United States sport aircraft
1990s United States civil utility aircraft
Single-engined tractor aircraft
Low-wing aircraft
Homebuilt aircraft